The Silent Partner is a 1978 Canadian thriller film directed by Daryl Duke and starring Elliott Gould, Christopher Plummer, and Susannah York. The screenplay by Curtis Hanson is based on the novel Think of a Number (Tænk på et tal) by Danish writer Anders Bodelsen, and is the third filmed adaptation of the novel.

The film was the first to be produced by Carolco Pictures and one of the earliest films from within the country to take advantage of the Canadian government's "Capital Cost Allowance" incentive plan, which gave production companies tax inducements to make commercial films in Canada. It has been called "one of the few truly good films to come out of the tax-shelter heyday of the 1970s."

The Silent Partner is also notable for being one of the very few films to have a score composed by jazz great Oscar Peterson, and for featuring an early big-screen appearance by John Candy. It was a major critical and commercial success, winning three Canadian Film Awards including Best Feature Film and Best Direction.

Plot
Miles Cullen, a bored teller at a small bank in a large Toronto shopping mall (the Eaton Centre), accidentally learns that his place of business is about to be robbed when he finds a discarded hold up note on one of the bank's counters. He also figures out who the would-be robber is when he sees a mall Santa Claus hanging around outside the bank whose "give to charity" sign has handwriting (especially the letter G), similar to that on the discarded note.

Instead of informing his bosses or contacting the police, Miles begins stashing the cash from his window's transactions in an old lunch box rather than in the bank's till. When the Santa Claus robber holds up Miles at the teller's desk, Miles, having expected his doing so, hands over a small amount and then reports he gave all the money from his day’s transactions.

The Santa Claus thief, a misogynistic psychopath named Arthur Reikle, figures out what happened when he sees news reports of how much was stolen during the robbery. He makes a series of violent attempts to get the money (totalling CA$48,300) that Miles has kept for himself. Reikle starts following Miles to and from his home, and making threatening phone calls to him.

Miles' coolness under pressure has attracted the attention of bank colleague Julie Carver, who has been having an affair with the bank's married manager, Charles Packard. After escorting Julie to a Christmas party at the Packards' house, he reveals to Julie that he is attracted to her.

When the menacing Reikle breaks into Miles' apartment and trashes it to look for the stolen bank money, Miles turns the tables yet again by following Reikle and setting him up to be arrested for the theft of a delivery truck. When brought to the police station to identify Reikle in a lineup, Miles does not point him out, aware that Reikle would then implicate him in the bank robbery.

A few months later, at his father's funeral, Miles meets a flirtatious woman named Elaine, who says she was a nurse who had been caring for his father. In fact, Elaine is secretly working with the imprisoned Reikle, who wants Elaine to keep tabs on Miles and possibly discover where he hid the stolen money. But by the time Elaine discovers that Miles has stashed the holdup money in a safety deposit box at his bank, Reikle no longer trusts her, correctly deducing that Elaine has become romantically involved with Miles. Julie, meanwhile, has begun to suspect something about Miles and his new girlfriend.

Reikle is released from jail and confronts Elaine over where her loyalties lie. When she admits that she has fallen in love with Miles, an enraged Reikle murders her in Miles' apartment, decapitating her in a broken fishtank. Miles is revulsed when he discovers what Reikle has done to Elaine, but recovers his calm and disposes of her body in the foundation of the bank's new building, under construction. Reikle, having watched Miles do so, confronts Miles and congratulates him on his cleverness, but says he will kill him too unless he gets the money.

Miles agrees, but insists it be handed over in a public place where no harm can come to him. They agree that Reikle will come to the bank, again in disguise, and be handed the money at Miles' window, where Miles will feel safe. The next day, Reikle arrives dressed as a woman. After Miles hands him a packet, Reikle says he intends to kill him anyway, for all the problems Miles has caused him. Anticipating that Reikle was intending that, Miles hands him a forged recreation of the original stick-up note, and shouts "he has a gun", triggering the alarm. Reikle panics, pulls out his gun, and shoots Miles, then flees into the mall, where he is shot by the bank security guard. A gravely wounded Reikle tells the guard that Miles gave him the bank's money; the guard, not comprehending Reikle's meaning, responds, "Whose money did you expect?"

A wounded Miles is taken away by ambulance. Julie goes along, telling Miles that she has figured out everything. He reveals to Julie that he has the stolen bank money, which she also knows. Both decide the time is right to quit their jobs and find another line of work, somewhere far away.

Cast

Production
Anders Bodelson's novel was published in 1969. The Chicago Tribune called it "an excellent suspense novel." The New York Times called it a "fine suspense tale". The film had previously been adapted twice, a 1970 Danish theatrical film directed by Palle Kjærulff-Schmidt and starring Henning Moritzen and Bibi Andersson, and a 1972 West German telefilm directed by Rainer Erler and starring Klaus Herm and Edith Schultze-Westrum. American filmmaker Curtis Hanson wrote the script on "spec" hoping to direct but was unable to persuade the producers to allow him.

The lead role went to Elliott Gould who called it "the best script I've read since The Touch. Gould later said, "I did adore Daryl Duke and we had a very good work relationship. " According to Gould, after the film was completed, executives wanted Daryl Duke to add a beheading scene and he refused, so he was removed from the film. Gould shot it with another director. "I was not happy about it," said the actor. "Daryl really did a wonderful job."

The film was the first to be produced by Carolco Pictures and one of the earliest films from within the country to take advantage of the Canadian government's "Capital Cost Allowance" incentive plan, which gave production companies tax inducements to make commercial films in Canada. The film was shot entirely on-location in Toronto. One of the central locations was the then recently-opened Eaton Centre, which was open throughout the shoot. Harry Reikle's hangout was The Silver Dollar Room, a well-known live music venue in downtown Toronto. Interior sets were constructed at Cinespace Film Studios in Kleinburg.

Hanson later said, "I ended up finishing the movie. I was brought back by the producers to do a week of pick-up shots and all of the post-production." Among the pick-up shots were scenes of Harry Reikle decapitating Elaine and Cullen disposing of the head in a plastic bag. The scene was added at the insistence of producers, but Duke refused to shoot it himself due to the graphic violence.

Reception
The Silent Partner did well in Canada both critically and financially, winning several Canadian Film Academy Awards including Best Picture and Best Director. The film was a sleeper upon its US release, with Brendon Hanley of the film database Allmovie noting that the film"...stands out as one of the best sleepers of the late '70s".

Critical
Roger Ebert, in his March 30, 1979 review in the Chicago Sun-Times, awarded three-and-a-half of a possible four stars to the film, calling it "a thriller that is not only intelligently and well acted and very scary, but also has the most audaciously clockwork plot I've seen in a long time." Ebert described it as "worthy of Hitchcock."

Gene Siskel of the Chicago Tribune gave the film an identical three-and-a-half star grade and called it "a very entertaining caper film." He thought that the film was "predictable" but the characters "are so joyfully written and played that you don't particularly care if you can figure out what's about to happen."

Janet Maslin of The New York Times wrote, "Just as he did with 'Payday,' Mr. Duke has put together a dense, quirky, uncommonly interesting movie, this time with a high quotient of suspense. He develops his characters firmly and fast, and populates the story with a lot of them, weighed down by the monotony of their lives but still, senselessly, always on the go."

Variety called it "one of the films that run the gamut from intrigue to violence. The excellent cast is headed by Susannah York, Christopher Plummer and Elliott Gould. It is entertaining."

Kevin Thomas of the Los Angeles Times wrote that the film was "tense and ingenious under Duke's light touch and boasts a fine Oscar Peterson score."

Gary Arnold of The Washington Post stated, "Before it takes an appalling turn for the vicious, 'The Silent Partner' seems an uncommonly clever and gripping suspense thriller. Even after the story threatens to self-destruct, you fight the impulse to suffer a major letdown, for the sake of the swell nerve-racking time you've been having up to that point."

Jay Scott wrote in The Globe and Mail, "As a suspense picture, The Silent Partner is first class: the story is told cleanly and the coincidences don't strain credulity unduly, although I wish screenwriter Hanson had not exhausted his imagination on the plot — the dialogue clunks when it should canter."

Elliott Gould claims he screened the film for Alfred Hitchcock, who loved it.

Accolades
The film was nominated for 11 Canadian Film Awards (Etrogs). Even though it was the only film in competition that had not been seen by the public it won six awards: best picture (for producers Garth Drabinsky, Joel Michaels, Stephen Young); best director (Daryl Duke); sound recording (David Lee); sound editing (Bruce Nyznik); original music (Oscar Peterson); and editing (George Appleby).

Legacy
Hanson said the film later influenced Bad Influence.

It was the first film from Mario Kassar who invested half a million dollars in it. He tried to remake it but says Curtis Hanson could not do it.

References

Bibliography

External links 
 
 
 
 
 Review of film at Cinema Scope
 Review of film at the Pink Smoke

1978 films
1970s crime thriller films
1970s heist films
1970s Christmas films
Best Picture Genie and Canadian Screen Award winners
Canadian crime thriller films
Carolco Pictures films
Cross-dressing in film
Remakes of Danish films
English-language Canadian films
Films about bank robbery
Films based on Danish novels
Films based on thriller novels
Films directed by Daryl Duke
Films shot in Toronto
Canadian heist films
Canadian thriller films
Neo-noir
Films set in Toronto
1970s English-language films
1970s Canadian films